The following is a list of songs in the Dance Dance Revolution series of games. Songs presented in this list are titled as they appear in their respective games and the credited musician's name appears as credited in-game. In many cases, the series features covers, remixes or tributes of songs by musicians hired by Konami, with original accreditation being cited.

The Rhythm-based Dance Dance Revolution series of music video games feature a number of songs that serve as functional equivalent of game levels. Most songs in the series are produced by in-house video game composers, however many games feature individual tracks by popular mainstream musicians. Different remixed versions of the same song often feature in different games as well as within a single game, and a number of games may feature the same version of a song. In-house music composers for the DDR series, such as Naoki Maeda or Sōta Fujimori are known to have employed a great number (as many as 3 dozen in some cases) of pseudonyms in the past. These pseudonyms reflect different musical styles used by composers and as such some songs credit two composers who are in actuality both pseudonyms of the same individual.

Soundtracks
Notable soundtracks of the Dance Dance Revolution series include:

Dance Dance Revolution 4thMix Plus
Dance Dance Revolution 4thMix Plus features a total of 150 songs. Two songs from previous games, "Strictly Business" by Mantronik vs. EPMD (removed in 3rdMix Plus) and "So Many Men" by Me & My (removed in the original 4thMix), are unavailable in this game.

Dance Dance Revolution 5thMix
Dance Dance Revolution 5thMix features a total of 122 songs, including 23 exclusive songs.

Dance Dance Revolution Extreme

Dance Dance Revolution Extreme features a total of 240 songs, including 11 exclusive songs.

Dance Dance Revolution SuperNova and SuperNova 2

Dance Dance Revolution X and X2

Dance Dance Revolution A and A20

Artists

In-house Konami artists
Naoki Maeda has contributed over 200 songs to Bemani games. Many of these are available in Dance Dance Revolution. Of the 52 songs in Dance Dance Revolution Konamix, half (26) are by Naoki. The composer left Konami in 2013, but his songs carried over to newer games, including Dance Dance Revolution A.

BeForU and lead singer Riyu Kosaka contributed 17 songs and three remixes to the Dance Dance Revolution series.

Kors K contributed over 100 songs to Bemani games.

Licenses
Several artists make recurring appearances in the Dance Dance Revolution arcade series. Some of these include:

 2 Unlimited (4 songs in 5 releases)
 Ariana Grande (2 songs in 2 releases)
 Bambee (4 songs in 7 releases)
 Bus Stop (6 songs in 13 releases)
 Captain Jack (11 songs in 13 releases)
 DJ Miko (2 songs in 5 releases)
 E-Rotic (9 songs in 4 releases)
 fripSide (2 songs in 6 releases)
 Jenny Rom (3 songs in 3 releases)
 Joga (2 songs in 9 releases)
 Judy Crystal (3 songs in 4 releases)
 KC and the Sunshine Band (2 songs in 6 releases)
 King Kong & D. Jungle Girls (3 songs in 8 releases)
 Me & My (2 songs in 8 releases)
 Ni-Ni (2 songs in 2 releases)
 Olivia Project (2 songs in 6 releases)
 Pandora (2 songs in 3 releases)
 Papaya (3 songs in 8 releases)
 Smile.dk (8 songs in 15 releases)
 Tess (2 songs in 2 releases)
 X-Treme (4 songs in 9 releases)
 Zedd (3 songs in 2 releases)

Songs

Dance Dance Revolution games
Lists of songs in music video games